Alexandria Station may refer to:

Alexandria station (Minnesota), Alexandria, Minnesota, United States
Alexandria railway station, Alexandria, Scotland, United Kingdom
Alexandria railway station (Ontario), Alexandria, Ontario, Canada
Alexandria Union Station, Alexandria, Virginia, United States
Alexandria Station (Northern Territory), a cattle station in Northern Territory, Australia
Alexandria railway station (Egypt), Alexandria, Egypt